John W. Jones (1894-1979) was president of Northwest Missouri State Teacher's College from 1945 to 1964. Jones was its first Ph.D president. He came to Northwest as dean of faculty in 1938.

During his presidency he oversaw a number of important building improvements and events:

Structures 
Bearcat Arena opened in 1959
Colden Hall
Bearcat Stadium improvements
J.W. Jones Student Union (dedicated in 1956)
Expansion of seven dormitories
Expansion of the Wells Library
Expansion of the Industrial Arts Building
DeLuce Fine Arts Building (under construction when he left office)
Martin-Pederson Armory dedicated in 1955 by Harry S. Truman

Events 
A gas tank by the Wabash Railroad tracks behind Residence Hall explodes injuring around 20 and killing Roberta Steel on August 28, 1951
First graduate level courses in 1955
Faculty rank system and tenure
Renaming of the school to Northwest Missouri State College in 1955
Statue of Abraham Lincoln in the Administration Building shot by a night watchman on May 17, 1959
Horace Mann High School on the campus closed in 1960
KDLX signed on the air in 1960
Women's basketball reinstitute in 1962
National Guard is called out during food riots in April 1964

References

1894 births
1979 deaths
Presidents of Northwest Missouri State University
Place of birth missing
Place of death missing
20th-century American academics